The First Itō Cabinet is the first Cabinet of Japan led by Itō Hirobumi from December 22, 1885 to April 30, 1888.

Cabinet

References 

Cabinet of Japan
1885 establishments in Japan
Cabinets established in 1885
Cabinets disestablished in 1888